Mamadapur  is a panchayat village in the Latur taluka of Latur district in the western state of Maharashtra, India.

Mamadapur is the only village listed for the gram panchayat.

Demographics
In the 2001 India census, Mamadapur had a population of 2,636 with 1,333 males and 1,303 females.Questioned

References

External links
 

Villages in Latur district
Latur district
Neighbourhoods in Latur

Villages in Latur taluka